John Edward Neal  (29 November 1899 – 14 January 1965) was a Welsh international footballer who played for UCNW Bangor, Llandudno, Colwyn Bay and Wrexham. He was part of the Wales national football team, playing 2 matches. He played his first match on 25 October 1930 against Scotland and his last match on 22 November 1930 against England.

The Unknowns
The Football League refused to allow clubs to release players for internationals if it clashed with a League game. Welsh selectors were forced to pick home based players, including Llandudno-born Neal. The team dubbed 'the Unknowns' and captained by Cardiff City's Fred Keenor gained a 1–1 draw against Scotland at Glasgow's Ibrox Park in October 1930. Neal won his second and final cap in the next match, a 4–0 defeat by England in Wrexham the following month.

See also
 List of Wales international footballers (alphabetical)

References

1899 births
1974 deaths
People from Llandudno
Sportspeople from Conwy County Borough
Welsh footballers
Colwyn Bay F.C. players
Colwyn Bay F.C. managers
Wrexham A.F.C. players
Wales international footballers
Place of birth missing
Association football forwards
Welsh football managers